Derek Oliver Gladwin, Baron Gladwin of Clee, CBE (6 June 1930 – 10 April 2003) was a British trade unionist.

Born in Grimsby, Gladwin was educated at Ruskin College and the London School of Economics.

Gladwin worked for the General and Municipal Workers' Union from 1956 to 1990, rising to the position of Regional Secretary (Southern Region). He was Chairman of the Conference Arrangements Committee of the Labour Party from 1974 to 1990, a position of considerable importance within the Labour Party.

Gladwin was appointed OBE in 1977 and CBE in 1979. On 28 September 1994, Gladwin was made a life peer, as Baron Gladwin of Clee, of Great Grimsby in the county of Humberside. In the House of Lords he served as a Labour whip.

References 

1930 births
2003 deaths
Labour Party (UK) life peers
Commanders of the Order of the British Empire
Presidents of the GMB (trade union)
Members of the General Council of the Trades Union Congress
Life peers created by Elizabeth II